McGarity is a surname. Notable people with the surname include:

Greg McGarity, American athletic director
Jack McGarity (1897–1974), Australian rules footballer
Lou McGarity (1917–1971), American jazz musician
Vernon McGarity (1921–2013), United States Army soldier
Wane McGarity (born 1976), American football player